Wayne Wilson (born 1 September 1949) is a Canadian weightlifter. He competed in the men's middle heavyweight event at the 1972 Summer Olympics.

References

1949 births
Living people
Canadian male weightlifters
Olympic weightlifters of Canada
Weightlifters at the 1972 Summer Olympics
Sportspeople from Toronto
Pan American Games medalists in weightlifting
Pan American Games bronze medalists for Canada
Weightlifters at the 1971 Pan American Games
20th-century Canadian people
21st-century Canadian people